The 1926 Muncie Normal Hoosieroons football team was an American football team that represented Muncie State Normal School (later renamed Ball State University) during the 1926 college football season. In its first season under head coach Norman G. Wann, the team compiled a 5–1–1 record.

Schedule

References

Muncie Normal
Ball State Cardinals football seasons
Muncie Normal Hoosieroons football